The 2016–17 Abilene Christian Wildcats women's basketball team represented Abilene Christian University during the 2016–17 NCAA Division I women's basketball season. The Wildcats, led by fourth year head coach Julie Goodenough and played their home games at the Moody Coliseum. This was the fourth year of a 4-year transition phase from D2 to D1, In the fourth year of transition, Abilene Christian could not participate in the Southland Tournament, but was a Division I counter and was part of the Division I rpi calculation. The Wildcats played a full conference schedule in 2016–17. Although they weren't eligible for the Southland Conference and NCAA tournaments, the Wildcats were invited to play in the 2017 Women's National Invitation Tournament.  The Wildcats had a 1–1 record in the tournament winning the first round game against the Oklahoma State Cowgirls and losing the second round game to the SMU Mustangs. They finished the season 23–9, 16–2 and tied for the Southland Conference regular season championship title.

Roster
Source:

Schedule
Sources:

|-
!colspan=9 style="background:#531C79; color:#FFFFFF;"| Exhibition Schedule

|-
!colspan=9 style="background:#531C79; color:#FFFFFF;"| Non–Conference Schedule

|-
!colspan=9 style="background:#531C79; color:#FFFFFF;"| Southland Conference Schedule

|-
!colspan=9 style="background:#531C79; color:#FFFFFF;"| WNIT

See also
2016–17 Abilene Christian Wildcats men's basketball team

References

Abilene Christian Wildcats women's basketball seasons
Abilene Christian
2017 Women's National Invitation Tournament participants
Abilene Christian
Abilene Christian